Delhi is a village in Delaware County, New York, United States. The population was 3,087 at the 2010 census. Delhi is the county seat of Delaware County.

Delhi village is within the town of Delhi on Routes 10 and 28.

The State University of New York at Delhi, partially within the village limits, is located southwest of the town hall.

History
Delhi was formally incorporated as a village in 1821.

The Delaware County Courthouse Square District, First Presbyterian Church, St. John's Church Complex, and United States Post Office are listed on the National Register of Historic Places.

Geography
Delhi is located in the center of the town of Delhi at  (42.278926, -74.916408), northeast of the geographic center of Delaware County. New York State Route 10 passes through the village as it follows the valley of the West Branch Delaware River, leading northeast  to Stamford and southwest  to Walton. NY 28 also passes through the village, leading northwest  to Oneonta and southeast  to Kingston.

The West Branch Delaware River flows through the village from northeast to southwest.

Demographics

As of the census of 2000, there were 2,583 people, 714 households, and 404 families residing in the village. The population density was 812.2 people per square mile (313.6/km2). There were 818 housing units at an average density of 257.2 per square mile (99.3/km2). The racial makeup of the village was 87.77% White, 6.97% Black or African American, 0.31% Native American, 1.82% Asian, 1.55% from other races, and 1.59% from two or more races. Hispanic or Latino of any race were 4.30% of the population.

There were 714 households, out of which 25.2% had children under the age of 18 living with them, 41.5% were married couples living together, 12.2% had a female householder with no husband present, and 43.3% were non-families. 34.0% of all households were made up of individuals, and 16.1% had someone living alone who was 65 years of age or older. The average household size was 2.20 and the average family size was 2.81.

In the village, the population was spread out, with 13.2% under the age of 18, 44.7% from 18 to 24, 14.8% from 25 to 44, 15.3% from 45 to 64, and 12.0% who were 65 years of age or older. The median age was 21 years. For every 100 females, there were 103.7 males. For every 100 females age 18 and over, there were 103.5 males.

The median income for a household in the village was $32,708, and the median income for a family was $42,692. Males had a median income of $27,109 versus $21,800 for females. The per capita income for the village was $13,421. About 8.1% of families and 14.1% of the population were below the poverty line, including 17.5% of those under age 18 and 7.1% of those age 65 or over.

Education
 Delaware Academy (K-12)
 State University of New York at Delhi

Cultural references
Delhi is the setting for the award-winning children's book My Side of the Mountain.

Notable person
 Michael Herr, author

References

External links
 

Villages in New York (state)
County seats in New York (state)
Villages in Delaware County, New York